"Waste" is a song by American singer Dove Cameron, released on September 27, 2019, by Disruptor and Columbia Records. The song was released alongside "Bloodshot", as part of Cameron's debut extended play, Bloodshot / Waste.

Background and release 
Cameron hinted at releasing new music in September in an interview with E! News in August 2019. She later confirmed that she would be releasing music at the end of September on September 23, 2019, via her social media. She formally announced the release of both "Bloodshot" and "Waste" on September 25, 2019. It was released on September 27, 2019.

Cameron told Rolling Stone: "'Waste' has always felt extremely special to me, It was always the one that grabbed me the most. It is probably the weirdest one; the production is definitely strange. I love that it's a love song without being a really melty, drippy."

She said to Billboard: Waste' is very much about that feeling of being so fucked-up over someone that you just want to waste yourself on them, bleed out every ounce of you and live inside them. That kind of agonizing, pain/pleasure, mad love is what we all either know personally, or want. Obviously, I am in a very public relationship [with Descendants costar Thomas Doherty], so it's safe to assume most love songs are about him."

Critical reception 
Brittany Spanos of Rolling Stone called the track a "dreamy, rock-tinged love song".

Music video 
The accompanying music video was released on September 27, 2019.

Personnel 
Credits adapted from Tidal.

 Jonas Jeberg – production, songwriting
 Chloe Angelides – songwriting
 Delacey – songwriting
 Dove Cameron – vocals, songwriting
 Ingrid Andress – songwriting
 Melissa Hayes – assistant engineer
 Chris Gehringer – mastering
 Mike Malchicoff – mixing
 Dan Book – recording

Release history

References 

2019 singles
2019 songs
Columbia Records singles
Disruptor Records singles
Dove Cameron songs
Songs written by Chloe Angelides
Songs written by Dove Cameron
Songs written by Jonas Jeberg
Songs written by Ingrid Andress